Juan Camilo Salazar may refer to:

 Juan Camilo Salazar (footballer, born 1997), Colombian defender
 Juan Camilo Salazar (footballer, born 1998), Colombian forward